The 1993 NHL Expansion Draft was an expansion draft held by the National Hockey League (NHL) to fill the rosters of the league's two expansion teams for the 1993–94 season, the Florida Panthers and the Mighty Ducks of Anaheim. The draft took place on June 24, 1993, in Quebec City, Quebec, Canada.

Rules
The 24 teams existing in the league at the time of the draft were each allowed to protect one goaltender, five defensemen, and nine forwards.  All first-year pros were exempt, and all second-year pros on the reserve list were also exempt.

Forty-eight players were chosen in the draft, two from each franchise.  Only one goaltender or one defensemen could be selected from each franchise.  Therefore, six teams would lose one goaltender and one forward, sixteen teams would lose one defenseman and one forward, and two teams would lose two forwards.

Both the Panthers and the Mighty Ducks were to select three goaltenders, eight defensemen, and thirteen forwards.

Protected players

Eastern Conference

Western Conference

Draft results

Phase II
There was a second phase to the 1993 NHL Expansion Draft, in which the Tampa Bay Lightning, Ottawa Senators, and San Jose Sharks (the three expansion teams who joined the league in the two previous seasons) selected players from the Panthers and Mighty Ducks.  The Panthers and Mighty Ducks were allowed to protect one goaltender, five defensemen, and ten forwards.  The three teams each chose two players.  The Panthers and Mighty Ducks each were to lose one goaltender, one defenseman, and one forward.

This mini-draft was held the day after the main draft, on June 25, 1993.

* The Lightning, on the same day, traded Glenn Healy to the New York Rangers in exchange for a third-round pick in the 1993 NHL Entry Draft.

See also
1993 NHL Entry Draft
1993 NHL Supplemental Draft
1993–94 NHL season

References
 Florida Panthers - Draft History
 1993 Expansion Draft Rules
 rec.sport.hockey Post with Draft Results
 Tampa Bay Lightning Media Guide (page 44)

External links
 1993 NHL Expansion Draft player stats at The Internet Hockey Database

Expansion Draft
Anaheim Ducks
Florida Panthers
National Hockey League expansion drafts